Meet Baluyev! (translit. Znakomtes, Baluyev!) is a 1963 Soviet drama film directed by Victor Komissarjevski and based on a 1960 novel by Vadim Kozhevnikov. It was entered into the 3rd Moscow International Film Festival.

Cast
 Ivan Pereverzev
 Nina Urgant
 Stanislav Sokolov
 Zinaida Kirienko
 Anatoli Romashin
 Sergei Plotnikov
 Pantelejmon Krymov
 Pavel Morozenko
 Pavel Pankov
 Sergei Blinnikov
 Igor Kosukhin
 Nikolai Kuzmin
 Arkadi Trusov

References

External links
 

1963 films
1963 drama films
1960s Russian-language films
Soviet drama films